Salem County Insane Asylum is located in Mannington Township, Salem County, New Jersey, United States. The building was built in 1870 and was added to the National Register of Historic Places on June 27, 2008.

External links

See also
National Register of Historic Places listings in Salem County, New Jersey

References

Hospital buildings on the National Register of Historic Places in New Jersey
Italianate architecture in New Jersey
Infrastructure completed in 1870
Buildings and structures in Salem County, New Jersey
National Register of Historic Places in Salem County, New Jersey
New Jersey Register of Historic Places
Mannington Township, New Jersey